Vodice is a small dispersed settlement in the hills east of Col in the Municipality of Ajdovščina in the Littoral region of Slovenia.

References

External links 

Vodice at Geopedia

Populated places in the Municipality of Ajdovščina